Richard William McIver  (born August 28, 1958) is a Canadian politician who has represented Calgary-Hays in the Legislative Assembly of Alberta since 2012. A member of the United Conservative Party (UCP), McIver is the current minister of municipal affairs.

He entered politics in 2001 when he was elected to the Calgary City Council, serving until 2010. In 2012, he joined the Progressive Conservatives (PCs) and was elected as a member of the Legislative Assembly (MLA). McIver was a cabinet minister from 2013 until the PCs were defeated in the 2015 provincial election. He served as interim PC leader from 2015 to 2017, and returned to cabinet when the new UCP formed government in 2019.

Political career

Municipal politics 
McIver first ran for the position of Ward 12 Alderman in 1998 against long time incumbent Sue Higgins. McIver came second but lost by a huge margin with Higgins receiving 15,000 votes and McIver with just under 3000 votes. During that term McIver ran in a by-election for Ward 14 again placing second of twelve candidates losing to Diane Colley-Urquhart by 288 votes. After Sue Higgins announced she would not run again in Ward 12, McIver ran there again, this time successfully in 2001. He began his first term as Ward 12 Alderman in October 2001. He was acclaimed to a second term in 2004. In the 2007 election, he again faced opposition at the ballot box but was re-elected with a 91% majority.

McIver held his post on Calgary City Council from his election in October 2001 until his run for mayor in October 2010. On April 21, 2010, he announced his intentions to run for mayor in the October 2010 municipal election.

He came in second in the mayoral election, garnering over 112,000 votes.

During his time on city council, McIver served on the following civic boards and committees:

Calgary Housing Company, Chair for three years
Standing Policy Committee on Community and Protective Services, Chair
Standing Policy Committee on Finance and Corporate Services
Land and Asset Strategy Committee
Family and Community Support Services, Chair
Provincial Justice Policy Advisory Committee
Audit Committee
Emergency Management Committee, Chair
Aldermanic Office Coordinating Committee
Calgary Police Commission
Alberta Urban Municipalities Association, Vice President

Provincial politics 
In December 2011, McIver ran at the provincial level challenging MLA Art Johnston for the Progressive Conservative Association of Alberta (PC) nomination in the Calgary-Hays constituency, a riding including many neighbourhoods of his former ward 12. McIver defeated the incumbent by a margin of 285 votes, taking the election 406–121. On April 23, 2012, in the provincial election, McIver was elected into the Legislative Assembly of Alberta, receiving 8,614 votes out of 15,642 (55.07%) to become just the second representative for the Calgary-Hays district since its creation.  McIver was sworn in on May 8, 2012.

In addition to his duties as MLA, McIver subsequently held the following roles in government:
Alberta's Minister of Transportation. (McIver was the first Minister of Transportation for Alberta to be selected from one of its major cities)
Government of Alberta's Treasury Board Committee. 
Government's Operations and Policy Cabinet Committee. 
Minister of Infrastructure. (assigned after a cabinet shuffle in December 2013)

Progressive Conservative leadership run 
McIver resigned from cabinet in May 2014 in order to stand in the PC leadership election, following the resignation of Premier Alison Redford. During the leadership campaign, he attended the March for Jesus. He later made it clear he did not share in the group's anti-gay beliefs after media attention to the event. McIver placed second with 11.7% of the vote, losing to Jim Prentice. On September 15, 2014, McIver was appointed Minister of Jobs, Skills, Training and Labour in Prentice's cabinet.

Progressive Conservative interim leader 
On May 11, 2015, following the party's defeat in the 2015 provincial election the previous week and the resulting resignation of party leader Jim Prentice, McIver was chosen by caucus to be interim leader of the PC Party. At the time, he did not rule out running for permanent leader at the leadership election to be held in 2017.

On April 18, 2016, McIver was thrown out of the Alberta legislature by Speaker Bob Wanner for repeatedly refusing to sit down despite the speaker's requests after learning that sheets explaining the speaker's ruling for an NDP amendment on a motion tabled by McIver had been distributed before the amendment was debated on the floor.

McIver announced on November 8, 2016, that he would not be running for the permanent leadership and will remain interim leader until the March convention.

United Conservative Party 
In 2017, McIver joined the UCP, along with most of the PC caucus, when the party merged with Wildrose.

At the party's founding convention in May 2018, McIver passionately argued against a proposed policy that would allow schools to inform parents if their child joins a gay-straight alliance. Addressing party delegates, he stated that “You may disagree with some people in the room with people being gay, but they are gay. They need to be safe. We cannot out kids that are in a club (designed) to protect themselves.” McIver further argued "Don't be called the Lake of Fire Party. I am begging you."  Despite these pleas, the policy passed with 57% support.

Electoral record

References

External links 
 Ric McIver

1958 births
Calgary city councillors
Living people
People from Woodstock, Ontario
Progressive Conservative Association of Alberta MLAs
Leaders of the Progressive Conservative Association of Alberta
Members of the Executive Council of Alberta
21st-century Canadian politicians
United Conservative Party MLAs